G.V.G Raju (born 12 April 1962) is an Indian film producer in Telugu language films. He is a national award-winning film producer known for producing trendsetting films like Tholi Prema (1998) and Godavari'' (2006), for which he won Nandi Awards.

He is married to Padmaja, daughter of Telugu actor Haranath_(actor)

References

External links

Living people
1962 births
Telugu film producers
Place of birth missing (living people)